The 2002 Toronto Argonauts finished in 2nd place in the East Division of the 2002 CFL season with an 8–10 record. They won the East Semi-Final but lost the East Final.

Offseason

CFL draft

Preseason
The Argonauts were the home team for a neutral site pre-season game in London, Ontario which was played at TD Waterhouse Stadium.

Regular season

Season standings

Regular season

Postseason

Awards and records

2002 CFL All-Stars
DE – Joe Montford
DB – Clifford Ivory
DS – Orlondo Steinauer
P – Noel Prefontaine

Eastern Division All-Star Selections
SB – Derrell Mitchell
OG – Sandy Annunziata
DT – Johnny Scott
DE – Joe Montford
CB – Adrion Smith
DB – Clifford Ivory
P – Noel Prefontaine
K – Noel Prefontaine

References

Toronto Argonauts seasons
Toronto Argonauts Season, 2002